Lake Kisale is a lake in the Democratic Republic of the Congo (DRC), in Bukama Territory, Haut-Lomami District.

Geography
The Lualaba River enters the Upemba Depression about  after leaving Lake Nzilo (Delcommune reservoir).
The river generally flows through the marshes between the lakes, to which it is connected by narrow channels. However, as it flows through lakes Lake Kabwe and Lake Kisale,  these may be seen as expansions of the river bed.

History
In 1957 pottery and metal objects were excavated from an Iron Age cemetery discovered at Sanga on the northern shore of the lake.
The site provides evidence for the origins of the Luba people of present-day Zambia and the DRC, thought to be one of the first groups to work with iron in Central Africa.
By 800 CE they were living in permanent settlements by the lakes, marshes and rivers of the region.

The soil is fertile, supporting productive farms for crops such as sorghum and millet, while fish and game provided sources of protein. The population grew and society became more complex. Grave goods include copper artifacts which must have been obtained by trading with people of the copper belt further to the south.

References

Kisale
Haut-Lomami